The Bondarikha culture or Bondarikhinskaya culture was a Late Bronze Age (11th-9th centuries BCE) archaeological culture of modern-day Ukraine. It replaced the Srubnaya culture. It was found from the left shore of the Dnepr to the upper and mid Seversky Donets, and it the east it reached the Don bassin and mid-Oka. It is represented by both fortified and non-fortified settlement, grave fields, treasures and scattered finds. They lived in pit houses, semi-pit houses and houses on flat ground. The cemeteries are tumuli, and flat ground graves with cremated remains in urns or small pits.

Archaeological cultures of Eastern Europe
Bronze Age cultures of Europe
Archaeological cultures in Russia
Archaeological cultures in Ukraine
Iranian archaeological cultures
Scythians